Yanko may refer to:

Yanko (name)
Yanko Shire, a defunct local government area in New South Wales, Australia
Parish of Yanko in New South Wales, Australia